Ivan Dmitrievich Ermakov (Russian: Иван Дмитриевич Ермаков; 6 October 1875 – 32 March 1942) was a Russian Empire and Soviet medical doctor and psychiatrist.

In 1911 Ermakov became director of the Psychiatric Clinic of Moscow University. In 1922 he was the first director of the Russian Psychoanalytic Society. Under his leadership, the Psychological and Psychoanalytic Library published translations of Freud's books.

Arrested in 1940, Ermakov died two years later.

References

1875 births
1942 deaths
Psychiatrists from the Russian Empire
Soviet psychiatrists